Black Siddha is a comic series created by Pat Mills and published in the British anthology Judge Dredd Megazine.

The story revolves around a super-powered Deva knight, Mardaka (literally "who crushes" or "who makes suffer"), who is "known and feared as the Black Siddha".

Synopsis

Black Siddha centers on Rohan, a young Hindu British Asian, who is revealed to be a reincarnation of the titular character, a brutal warrior who enjoyed killing but nevertheless held to a chivalric code. Mardaka's superpowers are known as siddhas, and amongst others he has the siddhi of sky-striding and armoured skin. He fights using an Urumi, a double-edged flexible sword, although his has magical qualities.

The basic narrative structure of Black Siddha is similar to two earlier works by  Pat Mills, Sláine and Finn, in that it utilises elements of an existing mythological framework (and in the case of the urimi, a real-life weapon) to both provide background and drive the story. In regard of its contemporary setting, at least, Black Siddha is more similar to Finn.

Bibliography

Black Siddha (by Pat Mills and Simon Davis):
 "Bad Karma" (in Judge Dredd Megazine #202-208, 2003)
 "Kali Yuga" (in Judge Dredd Megazine #218-223, 2004)
 "Return of the Jester" (in Judge Dredd Megazine #245-252, 2006)

References

External links 
 The 2000 AD ABC #16: Black Siddha at YouTube

Comics by Pat Mills
2000 AD comic strips
2000 AD characters
Comics characters introduced in 2003